Paul-Yves Pezron (1639, Hennebont, – 9 October 1706, Brie) was a seventeenth-century Cistercian brother from Brittany, best known for his 1703 publication of a study on the common origin of the Bretons and the Welsh, Antiquité de la nation, et de langue des celtes. Pezron was a Doctor of Theology at the Cistercian College of St. Bernard in Paris and abbot of La Charmoie.

In his time, he was known in France as a chronologist. Pezron traced Welsh and Breton origins  to the Celts of ancient writers, and traced the Celts further to eponymous hero-patriarchs from Gaul to Galatia. Pezron believed the Welsh language came from a mother tongue called Celtick, a language that was only a theory to other authors. Pezron's fairly unscientific book was popular and reprinted until the early nineteenth century.

References

1639 births
1706 deaths
Cistercian abbots
French abbots
French Cistercians
Linguists from France
People from Hennebont
Welsh language